In taxonomy, the Methanothermaceae are a family of microbes within the order Methanobacteriales.

See also
 List of Archaea genera

References

Further reading

Scientific journals

Scientific books

Scientific databases

External links

Archaea taxonomic families
Euryarchaeota